Tangled is a Disney media franchise started by the 2010 American animated feature Tangled, which was directed by Nathan Greno and Byron Howard from a screenplay by Dan Fogelman and produced by Roy Conli, with songs by Alan Menken and Glenn Slater.  Glen Keane, John Lasseter and Aimee Scribner served as the film's executive producers. The original film was loosely based on the German fairy tale "Rapunzel" in the collection of folk tales published by the Brothers Grimm.

The franchise consists of a feature film, a video game, a short sequel, a stage musical, and a television series, as well as a television film.

Film and television

Tangled (2010 film)

Tangled is a 2010 American 3D computer-animated musical fantasy-comedy film produced by Walt Disney Animation Studios and released by Walt Disney Pictures. Loosely based on the German fairy tale "Rapunzel" in the collection of folk tales published by the Brothers Grimm, it is the 50th Disney animated feature film. Featuring the voices of Mandy Moore and Zachary Levi, the film tells the story of a lost, young princess with long magical hair who yearns to leave her secluded tower. Against her mother's wishes, she accepts the aid of a handsome intruder to take her out into the world which she has never seen. Composer Alan Menken, who had worked on prior Disney animated features, returned to score Tangled.

Tangled Ever After (2012 short film)

Disney released a short sequel named Tangled Ever After in theaters in early 2012. The plot revolves around Rapunzel and Eugene's wedding day and about Pascal and Maximus losing the wedding rings and bringing them back.

Tangled: Before Ever After (2017 TV film)

The television sequel Tangled: Before Ever After, set between the events of Tangled and Tangled Ever After, was released on March 10, 2017. Tangled: Before Ever After doubled as a pilot for Rapunzel's Tangled Adventure.

Rapunzel's Tangled Adventure (2017 TV series)

A television series based on the film premiered on Disney Channel on March 24, 2017, entitled Rapunzel's Tangled Adventure. The series takes place between the events of original film and the 2012 short Tangled Ever After, with Mandy Moore and Zachary Levi reprising their roles.

Musical 

A stage musical adaptation of the film premiered on board the Disney Magic of the Disney Cruise Line on November 11, 2015, featuring three new songs by Menken and Slater. The show is one hour long, forty minutes shorter than the movie. The new songs are "Flower of Gold" (about the flower) and "Wanted Man" (Eugene's backstory) and  "When She Returns" during the festival.

Music
Tangled (2010)
Tangled: The Series (2018)
Rapunzel's Tangled Adventure (2019)
Rapunzel's Tangled Adventure: Plus Est En Vous (2020)

Video games

A video game based on the film was released on November 23, 2010 for two Nintendo consoles, Nintendo DS and Wii, as well as for the PC platform by Disney Interactive Studios.

The figure of Rapunzel is available for the Disney Infinity video game series, and is compatible with all three editions.

Rapunzel, Flynn, Maximus, Mother Gothel and Pascal are playable characters in the video game Disney Magic Kingdoms.

A world based on Tangled, "Kingdom of Corona",  made its debut in the Kingdom Hearts series in the game, Kingdom Hearts III.

Cancelled spin-off
Shortly following the series finale of Rapunzel's Tangled Adventure, series' storyboard artist Kaitlyn Ritter revealed that she and Anna Lencioni had pitched an idea for a spin-off focusing on Varian titled Varian and the Seven Kingdoms. The series saw Varian learning that his mother, Ulla, was an alchemist and sets out on a journey to search for her after discovering her almanac. He teams up with three other young heroes named Princess Nuru, Yong and Hugo to learn the seven alchemical stages of transformation and collect a totem for each so as to be reunited with his mother while also evading her former partner Donella who wants the totems for herself. Varian would have also encountered his long lost cousins who shared his scientific fascinations. Storylines would have revolved around Hugo being a hired agent of Donella who later turns on her and Ulla revealed to be the villain of the series with Varian trying to turn her good based on his own personal experience. According to Ritter, while Disney was enthusiastic with the project and even received support and encouragement, they ultimately passed as they felt that a series that focused on a Rapunzel-related character without Rapunzel would be risky. Disney even suggested changing Varian to a completely original character so as to be an original brand, but Ritter and Lencioni refused.

Cast and characters

Key
 A dark gray cell indicates the character was not in the film.
 A  indicates an actor or actress portrayed a younger version of their character.

References

External links

 
Walt Disney Studios (division) franchises
Film franchises introduced in 2010